Ioannis Dimopoulos (6 June 1932 – 22 September 2022) was a Greek politician. A member of the New Democracy party, he served in the Hellenic Parliament from 1974 to 1981 and in the European Parliament from January to October 1981.

Dimopoulos died in Pylaia on 22 September 2022 at the age of 90.

References

1932 births
2022 deaths
Greek lawyers
Greek politicians
Greek MPs 1974–1977
Greek MPs 1977–1981
MEPs for Greece 1981–1984
People from Pieria (regional unit)